The Duchess of Malfi is a macabre, tragic play, written by the English dramatist John Webster and first performed in 1614.

The Duchess of Malfi may also refer to:

 The Duchess of Malfi (Brecht), 1946, an adaptation by German dramatist Bertolt Brecht
 The Duchess of Malfi (opera), 1971, an opera in three acts by British composer Stephen Oliver

See also
 Duke of Amalfi